Fabricant may refer to:
 Florence Fabricant of The New York Times
 Michael Fabricant (born 1950), British Conservative Party politician
 Fabricant, the second novel in the Originator pair by Claire Carmichael

See also
 Fabrikant, a surname
 Union des Fabricants